Clement Wilson may refer to:

 Clement Wilson (athlete) (1891–1983), American sprint athlete
 Clement Wilson (writer) (born 1976), Irish journalist, author and travel writer
 Clem Wilson (1875–1944), English cricketer and Church of England clergyman
 Clement Wilson, also known as Ruckus, fictional Marvel Comics mutant supervillain